José Francisco Reinoso Zayas (born 20 May 1950) is a Cuban retired footballer who competed in the 1976 Summer Olympics and in the 1980 Summer Olympics.

International career
He also represented his country in 9 FIFA World Cup qualification matches.

Football administration
After retiring as a player, he was president of the Football Association of Cuba and a member of the Executive Committee of the Caribbean Futsal Association.

Personal life
Reinoso was born in Encrucijada to Francisco and Martha Reinoso and has two sons and three grandchildren.

References

1950 births
Living people
People from Encrucijada
Association football goalkeepers
Cuban footballers
Cuba international footballers
Olympic footballers of Cuba
Footballers at the 1976 Summer Olympics
Footballers at the 1980 Summer Olympics
Pan American Games medalists in football
Pan American Games silver medalists for Cuba
Pan American Games bronze medalists for Cuba
FC Villa Clara players
Footballers at the 1971 Pan American Games
Footballers at the 1975 Pan American Games
Footballers at the 1979 Pan American Games
Medalists at the 1971 Pan American Games
Medalists at the 1979 Pan American Games